AlphaWindows was a proposed industry standard from the Display Industry Association (an industry consortium in California) in the early 1990s that would allow a single CRT screen to implement multiple windows, each of which was to behave as a distinct computer terminal. Individual vendors offered products based on this in 1992 through the end of the 1990s.

These products were targeted at a low-end market.

The initial concept relied on custom (but low-cost) terminals which would support mouse interaction, (text) windowing support, and colored text. With that, plus special host software, the vendors proposed to support semi-graphical applications "transparently".

Organization 

The Display Industry Association was at the same location as Cumulus Technology (the same street address in Palo Alto, CA). Cumulus was a manufacturer of displays since 1986. Cumulus was heavily involved with development of the AlphaWindows standard. The members of the association in 1993 were:

 Terminal vendors
 AT&T / NCR / ADDS (partnership)
 Cumulus
 DEC
 Link / Wyse (partnership)
 Microvitec 
 Siemens / Nixdorf (partnership)
 TeleVideo

 Software vendors
 Cumulus
 JSB
 Nutec
 SSSI

Only Cumulus was proposing both to develop the terminals and the host software. However, Cumulus did not survive: it went bankrupt.

Software 

JSB Software Technologies produced MultiView Mascot. As noted in Unix Review:

, the product is owned by FutureSoft.

SSSI (Structured Software Solutions, Inc.) produced the FacetTerm session multiplexer.

References

See also 

 X terminal
 Twin

Text user interface